The South Mail was an Australian passenger train that ran from Sydney to Albury and Griffith until May 1985.

In June 1984, it was converted to XPT operation with the Griffith portion ceasing. With a lack of sleeping accommodation, patronage dwindled and The South Mail ceased operating in May 1985.

References

Named passenger trains of New South Wales
Night trains of Australia
Passenger rail transport in New South Wales
Railway services discontinued in 1985
1985 disestablishments in Australia
Discontinued railway services in Australia